The 1966 season of the Japan Soccer League.

League tables

Japan Soccer League

Promotion/relegation Series
Nagoya Mutual Bank became the first original JSL club to be relegated. In its place, Nippon Kokan from Kawasaki, Kanagawa was promoted and began a long career of league success that was only brought to a halt by the professionalization of the league.

Nippon Kokan promoted, Nagoya Mutual Bank relegated.

Team of the Year

References 

1966
1
Jap
Jap